Hormizd of Sakastan was a Sasanian prince who was the leader of a revolt in Sakastan and its surrounding regions. He was the son of Shapur Mishanshah, a Sasanian prince who governed Maishan, and was the son of the Sassanian shah Shapur I. Hormizd's mother was a certain queen named Denag. Hormizd had many other siblings named Hormizdag, Odabakht, Bahram, Shapur, Peroz, and Shapurdukhtak. In 260, his father died and was probably succeeded by Denag as the governor of Maishan. In 274, he was appointed as the governor of Sakastan and its surrounding regions. Three years later, when his cousin Bahram II ascended the throne, Hormizd's sister Shapurdukhtak married the latter. In ca. 281, Hormizd revolted against Bahram II, and was supported by the inhabitants of Eastern Iran, including the inhabitants of Gilan. Hormizd's revolt was finally suppressed in 283, and he was shortly executed under the orders of Bahram II, who appointed his own son Bahram III as the governor of Sakastan.

Sources

 
 

Rebellions against the Sasanian Empire
3rd-century Iranian people
People executed by the Sasanian Empire
Sasanian princes
Sasanian governors of Sakastan
Executed royalty